Nashlyn is an unincorporated community within the Rural Municipality of Reno No. 51, Saskatchewan, Canada. The former townsite is located 15 km west of Highway 18, about 10 km south of the village of Consul and Highway 13.

Education

Nashlyn no longer has a school. Those who live in Nashlyn and area are sent to the neighboring village of Consul which has a school that covers Kindergarten to Grade 12 serving approximately 100 students.

Climate

Nashlyn holds the record for the hottest month ever recorded in Canada with an average daily maximum of 35.8 °C recorded in July 1936.

See also

 List of communities in Saskatchewan

References

Reno No. 51, Saskatchewan
Unincorporated communities in Saskatchewan
Populated places established in 1910
Ghost towns in Saskatchewan
Division No. 4, Saskatchewan